James Macartney (1692 – 24 March 1770) was an Irish politician.

He was the only son of James Macartney (died 1727), judge of the Court of Common Pleas (Ireland), and his second wife Alice Cuffe, daughter of Sir James Cuffe (died 1678). Through his maternal grandmother Alice Aungier he was coheir to the Earl of Longford.

Family 

He married Catherine, the third daughter of the eminent judge Thomas Coote and his third wife Anne Lovett, and niece of Richard Coote, 1st Earl of Bellomont. They had six children, two sons and four daughters, including :

Francis Macartney MP, who died in 1759, before his father, without issue
Coote, who died in 1748, without issue
Martha, who married William Henry Lyttelton, 1st Baron Lyttelton and had issue, including George Lyttelton, 2nd Baron Lyttelton

Frances Greville ( c.1724-1789), the poet and author of the "Prayer for Indifference"; she married the politician Fulke Greville and was the mother of four children, including the celebrated political hostess, Frances Anne Crewe and the theatre-manager Henry Francis Greville.

Catherine died in 1731. Since both their sons had died before their father without issue, on James's death in 1770  his estates passed to his daughters and their children.

Political  career 

He sat in the House of Commons of Ireland from 1713 to 1760, as a Member of Parliament for Longford Borough from 1713 to 1727, and then for Granard from 1727 to 1760.

References 
 

1692 births
1770 deaths
Irish MPs 1713–1714
Irish MPs 1715–1727
Irish MPs 1727–1760
Members of the Parliament of Ireland (pre-1801) for County Longford constituencies